Greece has submitted films for the Academy Award for Best International Feature Film. The award is handed out annually by the United States Academy of Motion Picture Arts and Sciences to a feature-length motion picture produced outside the United States that contains primarily non-English dialogue. It was created for the 1956 Academy Awards, in which a competitive Academy Award of Merit, known as the Best Foreign Language Film Award, was created for non-English speaking films, and has been given annually since.

For the 78th Academy Awards, Greece selected Nyfes but it was ruled ineligible for being in English.

In the 1990s, Greek film law stipulated that the winner of the Greek Film Competition at the Thessaloniki Film Festival would represent Greece at the Oscars the following year. After Greek films that were mostly in English (and thus ineligible for the Foreign Language Film award) won the award in 2005 and 2007, Greece decided to revise the selection process. Beginning in 2008, the Greek submission is determined by an ad hoc committee appointed under the auspices of the Greek Ministry of Culture. The first film to be selected under the new rules was Correction, since El Greco contained too much English to qualify.

Submissions
The Academy of Motion Picture Arts and Sciences has invited the film industries of various countries to submit their best film for the Academy Award for Best Foreign Language Film since 1956. The Foreign Language Film Award Committee oversees the process and reviews all the submitted films. Following this, they vote via secret ballot to determine the five nominees for the award. Below is a list of the films that have been submitted by Greece for review by the Academy for the award by the year of the submission and the respective Academy Award ceremony.

See also
List of Academy Award winners and nominees for Best International Feature Film
List of Academy Award-winning foreign language films
List of Greek award-winning films in International Film Festivals
Cinema of Greece

Notes

References

External links
The Official Academy Awards Database
The Motion Picture Credits Database
IMDb Academy Awards Page

Greece
Academy Award